The 1896 College Football All-America team is composed of college football players who were selected as All-Americans for the 1896 college football season, as selected by Caspar Whitney for Harper's Weekly and the Walter Camp Football Foundation.

All-American selections for 1896

Key
 WC = Walter Camp Football Foundation
 CW = Caspar Whitney, published in Harper's Weekly magazine.
 PI = Philadelphia Inquirer
 NYW = The World of New York selected by Harry Beecher
 LES = Leslie's Weekly by W. T. Bull
 Bold = Consensus All-American

Ends
 Norman Cabot, Harvard (WC-1; PI-1; NYW-1; LES-1)
 Charles Gelbert, Penn (College Football Hall of Fame) (WC-1; PI-1; LES-1 [back])
 Garrett Cochran, Princeton (NYW-1; LES-2)
 Lyman M. Bass, Yale (LES-1)
 Louis Hinkey, Yale (LES-2)

Tackles

 William W. Church, Princeton (WC-1; PI-1; NYW-1; LES-1)
 Fred T. Murphy, Yale (WC-1; NYW-1; LES-1)
 Percy Haughton, Harvard (College Football Hall of Fame) (PI-1; LES-2)
 James O. Rodgers, Yale (LES-2)

Guards
 Charles Wharton, Penn (College Football Hall of Fame) (WC-1; PI-1)
 Wylie G. Woodruff, Penn (WC-1; PI-1; NYW-1; LES-1)
 Shaw, Harvard (LES-2; NYW-1)
 Edward Crowdis, Princeton (LES-1)
 L. J. Uffenheimer, Penn (LES-2)

Centers
 Robert Gailey, Princeton (WC-1; PI-1; NYW-1; LES-2)
 Burr Chamberlain, Yale (LES-1)

Quarterbacks
 Clarence Fincke, Yale (WC-1; PI-1; NYW-1; LES-1)
 F. L. Smith, Princeton (LES-2)

Halfbacks
 Edgar Wrightington, Harvard (WC-1; PI-1; NYW-1)
 Addison Kelly, Princeton (WC-1; PI-1; NYW-1; LES-2)
 John William Dunlop, Harvard (LES-1)
 William Bannard, Princeton (LES-2)

Fullbacks
 John Baird, Princeton (WC-1; NYW-1; LES-1)
 John Minds, Penn (College Football Hall of Fame) (PI-1)
 Edward Newcomb Wrightington, Harvard (LES-2)

References

All-America Team
College Football All-America Teams